North Carolina's 10th Senate district is one of 50 districts in the North Carolina Senate. It has been represented by Republican Benton Sawrey since 2023.

Geography
Since 2013, the district has covered all of Sampson and Duplin counties, as well as part of Johnston County. The district overlaps with the 4th, 10th, 21st, 22nd, 26th, and 28th state house districts.

District officeholders since 1985

Election results

2022

2020

2018

2016

2014

2012

2010

2008

2006

2004

2002

2000

References

North Carolina Senate districts
Johnston County, North Carolina